Sree Chitra Tirunal Institute for Medical Sciences & Technology (SCTIMST), Trivandrum, is an Institution of National Importance established by an Act of Parliament in 1980. It is under the aegis of Department of Science and Technology, Government of India, with an Institute Body and a Governing Body constituted as per the provisions of the Sree Chitra Tirunal Institute for Medical Sciences & Technology, Trivandrum, Act, 1980. The Institute presents a unique model by connecting the different strands of Biomedical Technology ,Clinical Medicine (Cardiac and Neurosciences)and Public Health to produce a seamless continuum of indisputable relevance to society.

SCTIMST – An Overview 

The institute's academic faculty is actively involved in clinical services, teaching, basic and translational research, biomedical technology development and Public Health research. From its inception, the institute has been providing subsidised care to the poor and the needy and has unfailingly implemented the health insurance schemes of the state and central governments.

Sub-Specialties Within The Super specialties Of Cardiac And Neurosciences 
The institute has successfully developed teams of super-specialists with expertise to ensure comprehensive cardiac and neurological care. The current focus is on

 Adult and Paediatric Cardiology programs, Cardiac Electrophysiology, Comprehensive Heart Failure Program, 
 Highly specialized comprehensive care programs for Epilepsy, Movement Disorders, Stroke, Muscle Diseases, Sleep Disorders, Neurodevelopmental Disorders, Multiple Sclerosis,
 Cardiovascular & Thoracic Surgery, including adult and paediatric cardiac surgery & Vascular surgery,
 Neurosurgery,
 Imaging Sciences and Interventional Radiology, and
 Cardiothoracic Vascular & Neuro Anaesthesia & Interventional Pain Clinic

These teams provide holistic and state-of-the-art services to patients from across the country. The institute also offers observership and training to specialists from other institutions.

The clinical departments of the Institute are supported by the Departments of Microbiology, Biochemistry, Pathology, Transfusion Medicine and Cellular and Molecular Cardiology that have robust research and academic programs, including MD in Transfusion Medicine and PhD.

Medical Device Development 
The Biomedical Technology Wing (BMT Wing) is committed to medical device development, research and teaching. The primary objective of the BMT Wing is promotion of biomedical engineering and technology, which is achieved through R&D activities related to

 medical devices,
 biomaterials,
 tissue engineering, and 
 product incubation and commercialization.

The sustained focus of the BMT Wing on medical devices has, in time, led to the development of several medical devices and transfer of technology to industry. Medical devices developed indigenously at Sree Chitra have substantially reduced the cost of many life-saving devices and are admirably in line with the policy of “Make in India” of the Central Government.

 India's first mechanical heart valve developed by the institute has now crossed 1,50,000 implantations. 
 The Chitra Blood Bag holds a major market share in this segment, with the product exported to about 70 countries. 
 The institute is credited with more than 70 technology transfers to industrial partners, including the membrane oxygenator, cardiotomy reservoir, concentric needle electrode, hydrocephalus shunt system, drug-eluting intrauterine device, dental composites, hydroxyapatite and bioactive ceramic composites. 
 Some of the recently transferred technologies include the TB screening device, PT/INR monitoring device, UTI diagnostic kit, Vein Viewer, Left Ventricular Assist Device, Cholecyst-derived wound dressing, injectable hydrogel for cartilage repair and lint-free wound dressing.
 The institute has about 106 granted Indian patents, 18 granted foreign patents and about 172 Indian patents and 15 foreign patents filed. Moreover, it has about 38 design registrations.

Technical Research Centre

In 2015, the Department of Science and Technology, Government of India, identified the Biomedical Technology Wing as a Technical Research Centre for Biomedical Devices (TRC), the nodal research centre for the development of medical devices in the country. The centre is mandated with the development of medical device technologies in 5 identified segments, viz. Cardiovascular, Neuroprosthetics, Hard Tissue Devices, Biological & Combinational Products and In Vitro Diagnostics.

A Medical Device Regulatory Compliance Facility for supporting the Indian Medical Devices Industry in the areas of medical device regulatory compliance, an Industry Institute Partnership Cell (IIPC) for training manpower for the industry and a Technology Business Incubator for Medical Devices and Biomaterials are components of the Technical Research Centre.

There are over 40 projects ongoing under the Technical Research Centre that are focused on development of important devices like the Deep Brain Stimulator, Left Ventricular Assist Device, Aortic Stent Graft, Atrial Septal Defect Occluder, Flow Diverter Stent, 3D-bioprinted liver and skin, bioactive material  platform for drug delivery in bone, bioprosthetic heart valve, leukodepletion filter, liquid embolization device and microspheres, intracranial electrode, infusion pump, centrifugal blood pump, and advanced wound dressings for varied applications, to name just a few.

Technology Business Incubator, SCTIMST - TIMed

SCTIMST-TIMed is a not-for-profit registered society in India, initiated in 2015 and promoted by the institute to encourage innovation and entrepreneurship in medical technologies through technology business incubation support to innovators, start-ups and industry. Located within the Biomedical Technology Wing campus, SCTIMST-TIMed is financially supported by the Department of Science and Technology, Government of India. It has currently 8 start-ups and over 10 innovators under the Nidhi Prayas Scheme of the Department of Science and Technology. TIMed is also a Sparsh Centre of BIRAC.

Testing services and accreditation

The Biomedical Technology Wing has the infrastructure and expertise to carry out the evaluation of medical devices and biomaterials, as mandated by internationally accepted norms like ISO 10993. The testing service of the institute maintains Quality Management System based on ISO 17025 and is accredited by Le ComiteFrancaisd'Acreditation (COFRAC) of France since 2003. A calibration service (mechanical and thermal calibration) is accredited by the National Accreditation Board for Testing & Calibration Laboratories (NABL).

Teaching and Training

The Biomedical Technology Wing offers PhD in Physical, Chemical and Biological Sciences, Bioengineering and Biomaterial Science and Technology.  The MTech Program in Clinical Engineering, which is a tripartite program in association with IIT Madras and CMC Vellore, and MPhil in Biomedical Technology are ongoing academic programs. Further, the Industry Institute Partnership Cell offers training programs in different aspects of biomedical technology to medical device industry and academia.

The Institute received the National Intellectual Property Award 2019 instituted by the National IP Office, Department of Industrial Policy and the Ministry of Commerce, Government of India, in the category of “Top Indian R&D Institution/Organization for Patents & Commercialization”.

Public Health 
The first Public Health School in India, the Achutha Menon Centre for Health Science Studies (AMCHSS), is at the forefront of providing a framework for health system development, human resource development and formulation of Public Health policies in Kerala and the rest of the country. Supported by research grants from major organisations in India and abroad, the Centre focuses primarily on chronic disease epidemiology and prevention and has the distinction of developing novel strategies for the prevention of chronic non-communicable diseases in community and worksite settings.

AMCHSS hosts one of the Regional Centres for Health Technology Assessment, with support from the Department of Health Research, Ministry of Health and Family Welfare, Government of India. The centre supports the use and dissemination of health policy and systems knowledge, and augments the capacity to generate, synthesize and use health policy and systems research among researchers, policy-makers and other stakeholders. The Ministry of Health and Family Welfare has designated it as a Centre of Excellence in Public Health Training and Research.

Teaching and Training

The MPH, DPH and PhD programs in Public Health offered by the Centre have contributed to the creation of technical expertise in various aspects of Public Health. The course module at AMCHSS, which has been adopted by many institutions in India, continues to build high quality human resource for Public Health.

Human Resource Development In Health Care Delivery 
An academic and research institution with the status of a University, the Institute grants medical degrees, diplomas and other academic distinctions and titles as per Clause 23 of the Sree Chitra Tirunal Institute for Medical Sciences & Technology, Trivandrum, Act. Currently, the institute offers post-doctoral (DM/MCh) courses in Cardiology, Cardiovascular and Thoracic Surgery, Vascular Surgery, Neurology, Neurosurgery, Cardiac and Neuro anesthesia, Cardiovascular Imaging and Interventional Radiology, Neuroimaging and Interventional Neuro-radiology, doctoral program in Transfusion Medicine, PhD in Biomaterials Science & Technology, Bioengineering, Chemical and Physical Sciences, Life Sciences, Medical Sciences and Health Sciences, MTech in Clinical Engineering, MPhil in Biomedical Technology and various diploma programs. Students from across India are selected through a highly competitive 2- or 3-tiered selection process. The institute also provides advanced training to a substantial number of nurses, technicians and other paramedical staff and equips them with expertise in these highly specialized fields.

History 

The origins of the Institute date back to 1973 when the Royal Family of Travancore gifted a multi-storey building, for the people of the region, and the Government of Kerala resolved to develop the gift as the Sree Chitra Tirunal Medical Centre for medical specialties. Sri P N Haksar, the then Deputy Chairman of the Planning Commission, inaugurated the Sree Chitra Tirunal Medical Centre in 1976, and patient services got under way. The Biomedical Technology Wing followed soon at the Satelmond Palace, an exquisite gift of the Royal family, located 11 km away from the Hospital Wing. The Vision of the first Director, Professor M S Valiathan, transformed the Centre into a unique institution that blends the practice of Department of Cardiology modern medicine with relevant research and technology within the same institutional framework.

The concept of amalgamating medical sciences and technology within a single institutional framework was regarded sufficiently important by the Government of India to declare the centre an Institute of National Importance under the Department of Science and Technology by an Act of Parliament in 1980, and name it as Sree Chitra Tirunal Institute for Medical Sciences and Technology, Trivandrum.  Dr Manmohan Singh, the then Hon’ble Finance Minister, Government of India, laid the foundation stone for the third dimension of the institute, the Achutha Menon Center for Health Science Studies (AMCHSS), on June 15, 1992. AMCHSS was dedicated to the nation by Dr Murali Manohar Joshi, the then Hon’ble Minister of Science and Technology and Human Resource Development, Government of India, on January 30, 2000.

The Hospital Wing 

The Hospital Wing of the Institute provides clinical services in Cardiology, Neurology, Cardiac Surgery, Neurosurgery, Interventional Radiology and Imaging Sciences, and Anesthesiology. It is also involved in research in Cardiac and Neurosciences. The Departments of Microbiology, Transfusion Medicine, Biochemistry and Cellular and Molecular Cardiology support the specialty departments and undertake research through the PhD Program.

Department of Cardiology 
The Department of Cardiology, comprising the sub-specialties of Adult Interventional Cardiology, Cardiac Electrophysiology and Paediatric Cardiology, is involved in state-of-the art patient care, research and academic programs that include DM Cardiology, Post-doctoral Fellowships in Interventional Cardiology, Paediatric Cardiology and Electrophysiology, and Post-graduate Cath Lab Technology.  

The Division of Adult Interventional Cardiology

National Centre of Advanced Research and Excellence (CARE) in Heart Failure (HF): The Department has been selected as a National Centre of Advanced Research and Excellence (CARE) in Heart Failure (HF) by ICMR, with a funding of 5 crores. The first Heart Failure Biobank in the country is being set-up as part of this research initiative. A state-of-the-art Heart Failure Intensive Care Unit, funded by TATA Trusts, is operational. A national network of HF has been established under the ICMR-funded National Heart Failure Registry.  

The Division of Paediatric Cardiology

The Division of Cardiac Electrophysiology and Pacing provides comprehensive care to patients, including children, with rhythm disorders. The centre has been one of the pioneers in cardiac electrophysiological studies and radiofrequency ablations in the country. About 400 electrophysiological procedures and 500 device implantations are performed every year. The Division performs conventional and 3D mapping-guided radiofrequency ablations regularly, and has advanced facilities like CARTO-3 and EnSite Precision systems to aid complex ablation procedures. There are specialised device clinics for outpatients, and dedicated procedural sessions for paediatric cases. Implantation of cardiac electronic implantable devices (including conventional and His/left bundle pacing, ICDs and cardiac resynchronization devices) are routinely performed. In the field of cardiac electrophysiology, the number of publications in indexed medical journals is one of the highest from any single international Centre.

The Division has been selected as a Regional Centre for Genetic Evaluation of Cardiac Channelopathies by ICMR. The goals of the centre are to: a) create a national level Registry to study the modes of presentation and demographics of patients with genetic cardiac arrhythmia syndromes, b) develop a genetic laboratory facility for detailed genotyping of these rare diseases based on new generation sequencing, and c) develop a nodal centre in the country, comprising cardiologists, molecular and clinical geneticists, genetic clinic, and facility for genotyping and genetic counselling.

Academic activity in the Department of Cardiology

The Department of Cardiology offers a systematic and structured training program including a 3-year DM in Cardiology, Post-doctoral Fellowships in Adult Cardiology and Interventions, Cardiac Electrophysiology, Paediatric Cardiology of 1-year duration and a 2-year PG diploma in Cath Lab Technology. PhD students are trained in subjects related to Cardiology. The Department is also involved in the MTech Course in Clinical Engineering conducted by IITM, Chennai, with periodic rotation of students. 

Research

High quality research in basic sciences and clinical cardiology is the hallmark of the Department. 

The Department has been part of major Registries, including the Trivandrum Heart Failure Registry, the Kerala ACS Registry, Registry for Atrial Fibrillation, Kerala Heart Failure Registry, National Heart Failure Registry and Newborn Congenital Heart Disease Registry

The Department of Cardiovascular and Thoracic Surgery 
The Department performs over 2000 surgeries in a year, covering neonates to octogenarians.

Clinical programs:

The Department conducts a robust postgraduate training program in cardiac and vascular surgery and has trained hundreds of young surgeons. The MCh Program, including MCh in Vascular Surgery, is one of the first in the country.  The Department is credited with conducting Fellowship Programs, including

 Paediatriac cardiac surgical program (neonatal cardiac surgical and grown-up congenital heart disease program [GUCH]) 
 Adult cardiac surgical program (coronary bypass - both on and off pump, valve repair, arrythmia surgeries, aortic surgery, comprehensive heart failure with the Department Cardiology) 
 Vascular and thoracic program (open and endovascular aneurysm with the Department of Interventional Radiology, carotid endarterectomy, video-assisted thoracoscopic surgery)

Device and product development: The Department has, over the years, been involved in biomedical technology development in collaboration with the Biomedical Technology Wing. The well-known TTK Chitra Heart Valve Prosthesis has had over 150,000 successful implants. Efforts are on for the development of the 2nd generation heart valve, mitral annuloplasty ring for valve repair, stent graft for endovascular aneurysm repair, the Sitra Vascular Graft, and the Membrane Oxygenator.  Products awaiting clinical trials include the 2nd generation TTK Chitra mechanical heart valve and collagen-coated vascular graft. Ongoing product development in various stages of in vivo trials are the Left Ventricular Assist Device (LVAD), Endovascular graft, Centrifugal pump for extracorporeal circulation, Mitral valve repair rings and the Bioprosthetic valve.

The Department of Neurology 
The Department of Neurology takes credit for implementing the latest diagnostic techniques and advanced therapeutics for patient management, imparting training to Neurology Residents, conducting clinical and basic science research and organizing national and international conferences and health education programs. 

Patient care services:

The Department has established various sub-specialties in order to deliver focused and specialized comprehensive patient care.

i) The R Madhavan Nayar Center for Comprehensive Epilepsy Care (RMNCEC) is one of the largest epilepsy centres in India offering comprehensive epilepsy care services for all types of adult and paediatric

epilepsies. The services provided are prolonged video-EEG monitoring, advanced imaging, and psychosocial and occupational care for patients with epilepsy. Nearly 1500 video EEGs and 120 epilepsy surgeries are performed annually.

ii) The Comprehensive Care Centre for Movement Disorders (CCCMD) was started in 1996 and is currently among the leading centres performing Deep Brain Stimulation

(DBS) for Parkinson's Disease. CCCMD has a ‘motor physiology lab’ that conducts electrophysiological studies (transcranial magnetic stimulation) in various movement disorders. It was the first in India to introduce micro-electrode recording (MER)-guided DBS surgery and image guidance (Surgical Planning System and Neuronavigation systems) for movement disorder surgery.

iii)  The Cognition and Behavioral Neurology Section (CBNS) caters to patients with mild cognitive impairment, dementia, aphasia and neuropsychiatry syndromes. The Section has close collaboration with the Alzheimer's and Related Disorders Society of India, (ARDSI), Trivandrum Chapter. Many neuropsychological instruments have been developed, translated and validated. It is also in the process of standardising a computerised neuropsychological battery for Indian population.

iv)  The Comprehensive Stroke Care Centre offers acute and long-term care services for individuals suffering from stroke. A dedicated stroke team, a state-of-the-art stroke ICU and facilities for mechanical thrombectomy and comprehensive stroke rehabilitation are major assets of this Section. It is a high volume Centre for Carotid Endarterectomy (CEA). In addition, carotid and intracranial angioplasty and stenting are performed for secondary stroke prevention.

v) The Neuromuscular Section, which manages disorders affecting the nerves, muscles and neuromuscular junction, has a streamlined EMG laboratory performing routine and advanced studies like single fiber EMG and motor unit number estimation. This sub-section has integrated activities with the Neurorehabilitation, Neuropathology and Immunology Sections. 

vi) The Comprehensive Center for Sleep Disorders has a 3-bed sleep lab with facilities for polysomnography, continuous positive airway pressure (CPAP) titration, multiple sleep latency test (MSLT), maintenance of wakefulness test (MWT) and Suggested Immobilization Test (SIT). 

vii) The Comprehensive Care Centre for Neurodevelopmental Disorders (CCCND) started functioning from August 2017 for multi-disciplinary evaluation and treatment of children with developmental disorders of the brain. The facilities in the Centre include a sensory integration unit, paediatric physiotherapy unit and alternative augmentative communication unit.

viii) The Multiple Sclerosis Division was started to provide clinical care and rehabilitation of multiple sclerosis and other CNS demyelinating disorders.

Academic activity:

The Department offers programs such as DM in Neurology, Post-doctoral Fellowship in Epilepsy, Movement Disorders, Stroke and Neuromuscular Disorders and PG Diploma in Neurotechnology. The Department runs a PhD program as well.

Research:

High quality research in Neurosciences is a hallmark of the Department.

 The research on pre-surgical evaluation of refractory epilepsy using video EEG, neuropsychology, multimodality  imaging,   electroencephalography-functional MRI   co-registration   (EEG-fMRI) and intracranial EEG along with brain mapping evaluation strategies are major interests of RMNCEC. Other research areas include genetics of complex childhood epilepsies such as developmental-epileptic encephalopathies and the Kerala Registry of Epilepsy and Pregnancy   (KREP) to support women with epilepsy. 
 The Comprehensive Care Centre for Movement Disorders has various research projects funded by major national and international agencies such as the NIH, INSERM, Dystonia Medical Research Foundation, Michael J Fox Foundation, ICMR and DST. The major research projects of this Centre include ‘Genetic architecture of Parkinson’s Disease (PD) in India’ (the first GWAS from the Indian subcontinent), the physiological basis of the salutary effects of Yoga on the neural control of movements and gut microbiota-brain axis alterations in PD. 
 The Stroke Unit undertakes research projects funded by the NIH, UK's National Institute for Health and Care Research (NIHR), Emory University, DBT and ICMR, with focus on neuroimaging, genetics, biomarkers in Stroke, and Stroke rehabilitation. 
 Other thrust areas of the Department of Neurology include development of low-cost indigenous devices such as Deep Brain Stimulation system, optical nerve stimulator and intracranial electrodes for epilepsy evaluation, functional neuroimaging and validation of assessment tools for autism, cognitive aspects in multiple sclerosis, genetics and biomarkers in dementia and brain mapping.

The Department of Neurosurgery 
The Department of Neurosurgery commenced its surgical procedures on 19 October 1976. The areas of expertise of the Department include:

 Vascular diseases of brain- Complex aneurysms, Arteriovenous malformations, Cerebral vascular bypass, Moya Moya disease
 Surgery for drug-resistant epilepsy, including Hemispherotomy, Invasive EEG monitoring, Callosotomy, Disconnection Surgeries, Surgeries for Hypothalamic Hamartomas
 Skull Base surgeries for Vestibular Schwannomas and Meningiomas
 Paediatric Brain and Spine surgery- including brain tumors, Congenital cranial deformities, Spinal dysraphism, Chiari Malformation, Craniovertebral junction anomalies.
 Surgery for Movement Disorders- Deep Brain stimulation(DBS) for Parkinsonism, Thalamotomy for tremor, pallidotomy
 Surgeries on the Spine- Spinal tumors, Degenerative Spine Disease, minimally-invasive spine surgeries
 Endoscopic Skull base procedures for Pituitary adenoma, Chondrosarcomas, Chordomas, Craniopharyngiomas, CSF Rhinorrhoea
 Surgery for pain- Trigeminal Neuralgia, Carpal tunnel syndrome
 Neurooncology- Surgeries for various Gliomas and Meningiomas

The Department serves over 3000 neurosurgical patients and performs close to 1500 surgeries annually.

Education and Training:

Over 110 neurosurgical aspirants have received Magister Chirurgiae (MCh) training and 25 neurosurgeons have had post-doctoral training in vascular and skull base surgery.

Research and Development:

The Department collaborates with the Biomedical Technology Wing and has developed indigenous medical devices and products such as Ventriculo peritoneal shunt systems (Ceredrain), Fibrin Glue, Bone substitutes for the skull, Dural substitutes and Invasive EEG electrodes.

The Department of Anaesthesiology 
The Department of Anaesthesiology is committed to excellence in anesthesia, perioperative care, pain relief, educational activities, faculty development and cutting-edge research. The Department comprises the Divisions of Cardiothoracic Vascular Anaesthesiology and  Neuro Anaesthesiology.

Academic activity: The Department offers 3-year DM and 1-year PDCC Post-doctoral programs in Cardiothoracic, Vascular and Neuroanaesthesia.

The Division of Cardiothoracic Vascular Anaesthesiology:

The Division supports cardiothoracic and vascular cases in 4 adult and 2 paediatric operating rooms, 3 catheterization labs, 2 DSA labs, 2 MRI suits and the CT room. Anaesthetic cover is provided for both diagnostic and therapeutic procedures.

By virtue of expertise in the field of perioperative care, the cardiac anesthesia team provides round-the- clock critical care services in the Cardiac surgical ICU, Congenital heart  ICU and Cardiac medical ICU.  

The Division Of Neuroanaesthesia And Neurocritical Care:

Patient care: The activities of the Division of Neuroanaesthesia and Neurocritical Care include patient care, teaching and training, and research. The Division provides anesthesia services to patients presenting for neurosurgery and interventional neuroradiology with various neurological problems.

Research: Faculty and Senior Residents are actively involved in various research projects, including clinical trials, funded projects and biomedical device development in collaboration with the Biomedical Technology Wing. Research is supported by funds from the Department of Science and Technology, Government of India, under Satyam, Cognitive Science Research Initiative, and Biomedical Device and Technology Development Programs. Medical devices being developed in collaboration with the Biomedical Technology Wing include the autonomic function monitor, low-cost defibrillator, ventilator for ICU management, cerebral micro dialysis catheter and so on.

Department of Imaging Sciences and Interventional Radiology 
The Division of Cardiovascular Imaging and Vascular Interventional Radiology:

This Division under the Department of Imaging Sciences and Interventional Radiology performs both cardiac and vascular imaging and image-guided interventions. The Division has a 264-slice CT scanner, 1.5 Tesla MRI, and 3 Tesla MRI machines with advanced MRI sequences like T1mapping, 4D Flow, scar quantification.

The Division runs a DM course and is involved in multiple research activities in advanced MR sequences, artificial intelligence and aortic stent grafts, and has the facility for 3D- printing of the heart.

Division of Neuroimaging and Neurointerventional Radiology

The neuroimaging and neurointerventional radiology division of department of Imaging Sciences and Interventional radiology provides state of the art imaging and neurointerventional services for various neurological and

neurovascular diseases respectively. Department is equipped with a 256 slice CT scanner along with advanced workstation for image reconstruction and functional analysis such as perfusion studies. High resolution images generated by CT angiography has largely replaced non-invasive angiograms and together with perfusion analysis, it has become the main work horse for stroke imaging and intervention. Two MRI scanners installed in the department has several advanced neuroimaging modules which are utilized for clinical decision making and research. Functional MRI studies, diffusion imaging including diffusion tensor and kurtosis imaging, susceptibility weighted imaging and quantification, arterial spin labelling for perfusion and angiography, qualitative and quantitative spectroscopic imaging, intravoxel incoherent motion imaging are some of the modules available. Several clinical and research studies are ongoing utilizing these advanced modules, in the field of dementia, neuroinflammatory diseases, stroke, neurovascular diseases, pediatric neurological diseases, to name a few. The department is also collaborating with several technology institutions in applying artificial intelligence techniques for imaging diagnosis, virtual reality applications and medical image processing. Functional non-invasive infrared spectroscopic imaging is available, used for clinical research of neurovascular diseases and stroke. The department annually performs on an average 4000 CT and 4500 MRI studies. The Department was one of the first in the country to start neurointerventional procedures.

A dedicated ICU is available for management of these patients and OPD services are also provided. Round the clock emergency services are provided for stroke treatment, vascular emergencies, life threatening bleeding etc.

The division is involved in various projects related to the device development in collaboration with biomedical wing, artificial intelligence, 3D modelling for anatomical teaching and utilizes inhouse 3D printing facility for therapeutic decision making. Several research projects are ongoing, related to neuroimaging and therapeutic outcomes of neurovascular diseases. The division annually performs about 250 neurointerventional procedures. The Department was first in the country to start a 3 year DM course in neuroimaging and neurointerventional radiology. The department also offers one year post doctoral certificate course in  diagnostic neuroradiology, two year Diploma in advanced imaging technology for technology students and PhD program in Imaging Sciences.

Department of Microbiology 
The Department of Microbiology provides diagnostic services to the hospital in the areas of Bacteriology, Virology, Serology, Mycology and Parasitology. In addition, the Department has an ongoing Homograft project in collaboration with the Forensic Department of the Government Medical College, Trivandrum, to supply cadaver valves for valve repair.

Department of Biochemistry
The Department of Biochemistry is involved in research that focuses mainly on the molecular processes underlying neurological and cardiovascular diseases.  Further, the Central Clinical Laboratory under the Department undertakes a range of laboratory diagnostic procedures of the institute with fully automated analysers. On an average, about 3000 investigations are carried out in a day.

The Department has recently established a Molecular Genetics and Neuroimmunology Unit for advanced molecular genetics diagnosis and research. The Molecular Genetics Laboratory has state-of-the-art facilities, including RT-PCR, Sanger sequencer and Next Generation Sequencer.

Department of Pathology 
The activities of the Department of Pathology comprise diagnostic services, research and teaching. The Department offers histopathology, cytology, immunopathology and autopsy services in neurosciences and cardiovascular and thoracic specialties. The neuroscience diagnostics encompass neuro-oncology, epilepsy pathology, muscle and nerve pathology and neuroimmunology. The cardiovascular diagnostics include valvular, vascular and tumor pathology. Research activities focus on translational and basic research in neuro and cardiac sciences. Academic activity involves interactive teaching sessions for super- specialty trainees.

Department of Transfusion Medicine 
The Department of Transfusion Medicine is a Modern Blood Centre that provides round-the-clock blood transfusion services to the hospital in-patients and to patients from other hospitals in and around Trivandrum. From 1 October 2016, the Department has switched totally to blood collection from Voluntary Non-remunerated Blood Donors, as directed by the National Blood Policy, Government of India. All the collected whole blood units are processed into various blood components to support the clinical use of blood. To ensure additional safety of blood and blood products, Nucleic Acid Amplification Testing (NAT) for all donated blood units was started in January 2019. The Blood Centre is licensed by the Drugs Controller General of India for blood components and apheresis procedures. The centre has also been designated as Regional Blood Transfusion Centre by the Government of India.

The Department conducts Post-graduate Course (MD) in Transfusion Medicine. Further, a 2-year Post-graduate Diploma in Blood Banking Technology is also conducted for science graduates. The National AIDS Control Organisation has identified the Department as a Training Centre for physicians, technologists, counsellors and nursing staff of Blood Centres in Kerala. The Centre collaborates with the Biomedical Technology Wing to develop indigenous products that would aid Blood Transfusion Services in the country.

Division of Cellular and Molecular Cardiology 

The Division of Cellular and Molecular Cardiology aims at fostering interdisciplinary research in cardiac biology, focusing on the etiology and pathogenesis of cardiac diseases. A full-fledged cell culture facility with standardized protocols for the isolation and culture of cardiac fibroblasts, cardiomyocytes and cardiac progenitor cells, and a laboratory for molecular studies, permit incisive investigations in cardiac biology in the Division. One of the major goals of the Division is to probe mechanisms that underlie cardiac fibrosis and heart failure, focusing on the molecular basis of cardiac fibroblast growth and the regulation of collagen and connexin gene expression in the heart using a variety of experimental models. Another important objective is to identify factors and mechanisms that compromise the survival and paracrine functions of cardiac progenitor cells in a setting of cardiac injury. The Division has had long-standing collaboration with the NIA/NH, USA. A robust PhD program, supported by research grants from national funding agencies like DST, DBT and ICMR, seeks to promote Molecular Cardiology in the country.

The Computer Division  and the Division of Clinical Engineering have highly qualified professionals and state-of-the-art facilities to perform a range of functions and admirably support the activities of the institute.

The Biomedical Technology Wing 
The Biomedical Technology Wing (BMT Wing), located in the scenic Satelmond Palace in Poojappura, Thiruvananthapuram, has a culturally diverse and pluralistic team committed to medical device development, research and teaching. The primary objective of the BMT Wing is the promotion of biomedical engineering and technology, which is achieved through R&D activities related to

 medical devices,
 biomaterials,
 tissue engineering, and
 product incubation and commercialization.

The campus has trained manpower, sophisticated facilities, structured systems and testing protocols for the development and testing of medical devices and biomaterials. The multi-disciplinary expertise available at the Institute in clinical, engineering, biomaterial, biological, veterinary, and Public Health sciences constitutes the bedrock for biomedical product development. The BMT Wing receives inputs relating to unmet clinical needs from the clinicians, develops technology that is functionally on par with the imported ones but cost-effective, evaluates these technologies based on international standards and regulatory guidelines, and eventually associates with industry for scale up and commercialisation.

Product development

BMT Wing has a long history of medical device development, dating back to the 1980s, and is credited with the development of India's first mechanical heart valve that has now crossed 1,50,000 implantations, with TTK Healthcare Ltd as manufacturing partner. The Chitra Blood Bag, with manufacturing partners, Terumo Penpol Ltd and HLL Lifecare Ltd, holds a major market share in this segment, with the product exported to about 70 countries.

Other important technologies developed and transferred include the membrane oxygenator, cardiotomy reservoir, concentric needle electrode, (Manufacturing partner: M/s. SIDD Lifesciences), Hydrocephalus shunt system, Drug-eluting intrauterine device (Manufacturing partner: M/s. HLL Lifecare Ltd), Dental composites (Manufacturing partner: M/s. AnabondStedmann Pharma Ltd), Hydroxyapatite and bioactive ceramic composites (Manufacturing partner: M/s. Basic Healthcare Ltd).

Technical Research Centre

In 2015, the Department of Science and Technology, Government of India, identified the Biomedical Technology Wing as a Technical Research Centre for Biomedical Devices (TRC), the nodal research centre for the development of medical devices in the country. The centre is mandated with the development of medical device technologies in 5 identified segments, viz. Cardiovascular, Neuroprosthetics, Hard Tissue Devices, Biological & Combinational Products and In Vitro Diagnostics.

A Medical Device Regulatory Compliance Facility (MDRCF) for supporting the Indian Medical Devices Industry in the areas of medical device regulatory compliance, an Industry Institute Partnership Cell (IIPC) for training manpower for the industry and a Technology Business Incubator for Medical Devices and Biomaterials (TIMed) are  components of the Technical Research Centre.

There are over 40 ongoing projects under the Technical Research Centre that are focused on development of important devices like the Deep Brain Stimulator, Left Ventricular Assist Device, Aortic Stent Graft, Atrial Septal Defect Occluder, Flow Diverter Stent, 3D bioprinted liver and skin, bioactive material  platform for drug delivery in bone, bioprosthetic heart valve, leukodepletion filter, liquid embolization device and microspheres, intracranial electrode, infusion pump, centrifugal blood pump, and advanced wound dressings for varied applications, to name just a few.

Technology Transfer and Intellectual Property Rights

Strong association with industry helps the Institute in taking its technologies and products to the patient population. The industrial partner can associate with a product at any time during the technology development phase.

The institute is credited with more than 70 technology transfers, and some of the recently transferred technologies include the TB screening device, PT/INR monitoring device, UTI diagnostic kit, Vein Viewer (M/s. Agappe Diagnostics Ltd), Left Ventricular Assist Device (M/s. Meril Lifesciences Pvt Ltd), Cholecyst-derived wound dressing (M/s. Alicorn Medicals ),injectable hydrogel for cartilage repair, lint-free wound dressing (M/s. Phraction Scientifics), and albumin conjugated with drug (M/s. EightoaksbioPvt Ltd).

The Institute received the National Intellectual Property Award 2019 instituted by the National IP Office, Department of Industrial Policy and the Ministry of Commerce, Government of India, in the category, “Top Indian R & D Institution / Organization for Patents & Commercialization”.  The Award recognizes enterprises for their creation and commercialization of IP that has contributed to harnessing the country's intellectual capital and creating an IP eco-system that boosts creativity and innovation.

The institute has around 106 granted Indian patents, 18 granted foreign patents and around 172 Indian patents and 15 foreign patents filed. Moreover, it has about 38 design registrations.

Technology Business Incubator, SCTIMST - TIMed

SCTIMST-TIMed is a not-for-profit registered society in India initiated in 2015 and promoted by the institute to encourage innovation and entrepreneurship in medical technologies through technology business incubation support to innovators, start-ups and industry. Located within the Biomedical Technology Wing campus, it is financially supported by the Department of Science and Technology, Government of India. It has currently 8 start-ups and over 10 innovators under the Nidhi Prayas Scheme of the Department of Science and Technology. TIMed is a Sparsh Centre of BIRAC.

Testing services and accreditation

The Biomedical Technology Wing has the infrastructure and expertise to carry out the evaluation of medical devices and biomaterials, as mandated by internationally accepted norms like ISO 10993. The evaluation capability includes large animal functional and efficacy studies, biocompatibility evaluation including cell culture, toxicology, microbiology, blood compatibility and histopathological evaluation, physicochemical evaluation, shelf-life studies, calibration and so on.  The testing service of the institute maintains Quality Management System based on ISO 17025 and is accredited by Le Comite Francais d'Acreditation (COFRAC) of France since 2003. A calibration service (mechanical and thermal calibration) is accredited by the National Accreditation Board for Testing & Calibration Laboratories (NABL).

Teaching and Training

The Biomedical Technology Wing offers PhD in Physical, Chemical and Biological Sciences, Bioengineering and Biomaterial Science and Technology.  The MTech Program in Clinical Engineering, which is a tripartite programme in association with IIT Madras and CMC Vellore, and MPhil in Biomedical Technology are other ongoing academic programs. Further, the Industry Institute Partnership Cell offers training programs in different aspects of biomedical technology to medical device industry and academia.

The Achutha Menon Centre for Health Science Studies 

The Achutha Menon Centre for Health Science Studies (AMCHSS) at the institute, one of the first Public Health Schools in India, is at the forefront of providing a framework for health system development, human resource development and formulation of public health policies in Kerala and India. Supported by research grants from major organisations in India and abroad, the Centre focuses primarily on chronic disease epidemiology and prevention and has the distinction of developing novel strategies for the prevention of chronic non-communicable diseases in community and worksite settings. It has been recognized as a Centre of Excellence for Training in Public Health by the Ministry of Health and Family Welfare, Government of India.

AMCHSS hosts one of the Regional Centres for Health Technology Assessment, with support from the Department of Health Research, Ministry of Health and Family Welfare, Government of India. AMCHSS promotes the generation and synthesis of policy-relevant health systems knowledge, supports the use and dissemination of health policy and systems knowledge, and augments the capacity to generate, synthesize and use health policy and system research among researchers, policy-makers and other stakeholders.

Teaching and Training

The MPH, DPH and PhD programs in Public Health have contributed to the development of human resource with technical expertise in various aspects of Public Health. The course module at AMCHSS has been adopted by many institutions in India and it continues to build quality human resources for public health. In addition to core subjects like Epidemiology and Biostatistics, the centre has innovated and introduced topics such as Ethics in Health Research, Public Health Ethics, Environmental Health and Public Health Technologies as part of its Masters in Public Health curriculum. The Centre started its academic teaching programme in January 1997. Students from diverse disciplinary backgrounds, including AYUSH, get trained in Public Health. AMCHSS offers MPH through its partner institutions: the National Institute of Epidemiology (Chennai), Christian Medical College (Vellore) and Indian Institute of Public Health (Delhi).

As of June 2020, 306 individuals have graduated with an MPH, 71 with a DPH and 15 with a PhD.

Academic Programs at the Institute 

The Sree Chitra Tirunal Institute for Medical Sciences and Technology, Trivandrum, is a much sought-after destination for super-specialty courses leading to DM or MCh Degrees in Cardiac and Neurosciences. This is also one of the few institutions that offer Post-doctoral Fellowship Programs in the subspecialty areas of Cardiac and Neurosciences. In addition, the institute offers Masters and PhD courses in Medical, Biomedical and Health Sciences, and Diploma and PG Diploma courses in related areas.

Programs offered include:

Post-doctoral courses

 DM Cardiology 
 DM Neurology 
 DM Neuroimaging and Interventional Neuroradiology 
 DM Cardiovascular imaging and Vascular Interventional Radiology 
 DM Cardiothoracic & Vascular Anaesthesia 
 DM Neuroanaesthesia
 MCh Cardiovascular & Thoracic Surgery 
 MCh Vascular Surgery 
 MCh Neurosurgery (after MS) 
 MCh Neurosurgery - 5-year course (after MBBS and 1 year Senior house surgency/ Residency in General Surgery) 
 Post-doctoral certificate course in Cardiothoracic and Vascular Anaesthesia 
 Po Post-doctoral certificate course in Neuroanaesthesia
 Post-doctoral certificate course in Diagnostic Neuroradiology 
 Post-doctoral certificate course in Vascular Surgery 
 Post-doctoral fellowship (Post DM/MCh/DNB)

PhD/Masters Courses

 MD in Transfusion Medicine 
 Master of Public Health (MPH) 
 M Phil (Biomedical Technology) 
 PhD (Full Time & Part Time)

Diploma Courses

 Public Health 
 Cardiovascular & Thoracic Nursing 
 Neuro-Nursing 
 Operation Theatre and Anaesthesia Technology 
 Advanced Medical Imaging Technology

PG Diploma Courses

  Cardiac Laboratory Technology 
  Neuro-Technology 
 Medical Records Science 
  Clinical Perfusion 
 Blood Banking Technology

Advanced Certificate CoursesIn

 Physiotherapy 
 Physiotherapy in Neurological Sciences 
 Physiotherapy in Cardiovascular Sciences

Joint Programs with other institutions

 MTech (Clinical Engineering)
 PhD (Biomedical Devices and Technology)

Affiliated Programs with other Centres

A. National Institute of Epidemiology, Chennai

 Master of Public Health (Epidemiology and Health Systems)

B. Christian Medical College, Vellore

 MS Bioengineering
 PhD in Bioengineering/Biomedical Sciences
 Master of Public Health (MPH)

C. Indian Institute Information Technology & Management - Kerala, Trivandrum

 PhD (Medical Imaging Technology)

D. Indian Institute of Public Health, New Delhi

 Master of Public Health (MPH)                                     
 PhD

Admissions:

Admission to various programs of study is regulated by policies and procedures approved by the Academic Committee of the institute from time to time. The Admission announcement is published all over India through advertisements in leading newspapers during the 1st week of September every year and is posted on the Institute website. The assessment and interviews for admission are held at the institute during the months of November/December. Admissions to PhD (Fellowship holders) and MPhil (Biomedical Technology) are carried out during July/August.

References

External links

 

Thiruvananthapuram
Medical research institutes in India
Research institutes in Thiruvananthapuram
Medical colleges in Thiruvananthapuram
Educational institutions established in 1973
Colleges affiliated with the Kerala University of Health Sciences
1973 establishments in Kerala
Hospitals in Thiruvananthapuram
Hospitals established in 1973
Research institutes established in 1973